505 George Street is a skyscraper that has been approved for construction in Sydney, Australia, on the current Event Cinemas site in George Street. It will also include a rooftop restaurant and bar. When finished, it will be the tallest residential building in the city. It is being designed by Ingenhoven Architects. Initial concepts for a tower on the site were first proposed in 2014 with the initial tower design reaching a height of approximately 263 metres. In May 2020, the City of Sydney granted final planning approval for the tower to go ahead. Demolition of the existing site is yet to be announced, futhering the current date of completion to be unknown for the time being.

See also 

 List of tallest buildings in Sydney

References 

Proposed buildings and structures in Sydney